The women's 400 metres hurdles event at the 2020 Summer Olympics took place between 31 July and 4 August 2021 at the Japan National Stadium. 39 athletes from 25 nations competed.

At the U.S. Olympic trials in June 2021, Sydney McLaughlin became the first woman to run the event in under 52 seconds, improving Dalilah Muhammad's world record of 52.16 secs to 51.90. In Tokyo, both women ran inside the world record, with McLaughlin winning the gold medal with a new world record time of 51.46, while 2016 Olympic champion Muhammad ran 51.58 for the silver medal. Dutch athlete Femke Bol broke the European record 
with 52.03 for the bronze, to move to third on the world all-time list. Another three national records (for Colombia, Belgium and Panama) were set during the competition.

Summary
2021 was a dynamic year for the women's 400 metres hurdles. Returning gold medalist and reigning world champion Dalilah Muhammad began the year with the world record from that world championship race. But she was pushed to that record and her previous world record by her American teammate Sydney McLaughlin. McLaughlin was also in the Rio Olympics, but then she made news for qualifying for the semi final round a few days after her seventeenth birthday. In 2019 McLaughlin matured to be a few steps off the world record while gaining the world championship silver medal. In 2021 at the United States Olympic Trials, she reversed that picture by winning with a new world record of 51.90. A week later, another hurdler, 6 months younger than McLaughlin, Femke Bol improved her personal best to 52.37, to become the #4 performer of all time, behind #1 McLaughlin and #2 Muhammad. A new world record was predicted for this event. Those same three athletes were the three individual semi-final winners qualifying for the final.

Knowing she had to run a world record, Muhammad was out fast clearing the first hurdle just ahead of McLaughlin and Bol. By the third hurdle, she had passed the athletes staggered to her outside.  Muhammad kept the pressure up over each hurdle, with McLaughlin three lanes inside of her, watching her. Keeping pace, Bol was touching down just a fraction of a step behind McLaughlin. Those three separated from the rest of the field but kept the same pattern, Muhammad, McLaughlin, Bol over all ten hurdles. When she crossed the finish line, Muhammad had bettered the 6-week-old world record by almost a third of a second, 51.58. And McLaughlin had run faster from the last hurdle home to win, setting a new world record in 51.46. Bol was just barely behind the previous world record in 52.03, the #3 performer and #4 performance ever all in the same race.

Background
This was the 10th appearance of the event, having appeared at every Olympics since 1984.

Qualification

A National Olympic Committee (NOC) could enter up to 3 qualified athletes in the women's 400 metres hurdles event if all athletes meet the entry standard or qualify by ranking during the qualifying period. (The limit of 3 has been in place since the 1930 Olympic Congress.) The qualifying standard is 55.40 seconds. This standard was "set for the sole purpose of qualifying athletes with exceptional performances unable to qualify through the IAAF World Rankings pathway." The world rankings, based on the average of the best five results for the athlete over the qualifying period and weighted by the importance of the meet, will then be used to qualify athletes until the cap of 40 is reached.

The qualifying period was originally from 1 May 2019 to 29 June 2020. Due to the COVID-19 pandemic, the period was suspended from 6 April 2020 to 30 November 2020, with the end date extended to 29 June 2021. The world rankings period start date was also changed from 1 May 2019 to 30 June 2020; athletes who had met the qualifying standard during that time were still qualified, but those using world rankings would not be able to count performances during that time. The qualifying time standards could be obtained in various meets during the given period that have the approval of the IAAF. Both indoor and outdoor meets are eligible. The most recent Area Championships may be counted in the ranking, even if not during the qualifying period.

NOCs can also use their universality place—each NOC can enter one female athlete regardless of time if they had no female athletes meeting the entry standard for an athletics event—in the 400 metres hurdles.

Competition format
The event continued to use the three-round  format introduced in 2012.

Records
Prior to this competition, the existing world, Olympic, and area records were as follows.

New records
The following new World and Olympic records were set during this competition:

The following national records were set during this competition:

Schedule
All times are Japan Standard Time (UTC+9)

The women's 400 metres hurdles took place over three separate days.

Results

Round 1 
Qualification Rules: First 4 in each heat (Q) and the next 4 fastest (q) advance to the Semifinals.

Heat 1

Heat 2

Heat 3

Heat 4

Heat 5

Semi finals
Qualification Rules: First 2 in each heat (Q) and the next 2 fastest (q) advance to the Final

Semi final 1

Semi final 2

Semi final 3

Final

References

Women's 400 metres hurdles
2020
Women's events at the 2020 Summer Olympics
Olympics